"Goldilocks and the Three Bears" (originally titled "The Story of the Three Bears") is a 19th-century English fairy tale of which three versions exist. The original version of the tale tells of an obscene old woman who enters the forest home of three anthropomorphic bachelor bears while they are away. She eats some of their porridge, sits down on one of their chairs and breaks it, and sleeps in one of their beds. When the bears return and discover her, she wakes up, jumps out of the window, and is never seen again. The second version replaces the old woman with a young girl named Goldilocks, and the third and by far best-known version replaces the bachelor trio with a family of three.

What was originally a frightening oral tale became a cosy family story with only a hint of menace. The story has elicited various interpretations and has been adapted to film, opera, and other media. "Goldilocks and the Three Bears" is one of the most popular fairy tales in the English language.

Original plot 

In Robert Southey's version of the tale ("The Story of the Three Bears"), three anthropomorphic bears – "a little, small, wee bear, a middle-sized bear, and a great, huge bear" – live together in a house in the woods. Southey describes them as very good-natured, trusting, harmless, tidy, and hospitable. Each of these "bachelor" bears has his own porridge bowl, chair, and bed. One day they make porridge for breakfast, but it is too hot to eat, so they decide to take a walk in the woods while their porridge cools. An old woman approaches the bears' house. She has been sent out by her family because she is a disgrace to them. She is impudent, bad-mannered, foul-mouthed, ugly, dirty, and a vagrant deserving of a stint in the House of Correction. She looks through a window, peeps through the keyhole, and lifts the latch. Assured that no one is home, she walks in. The old woman eats the Wee Bear's porridge, then settles into his chair and breaks it. Prowling about, she finds the bears' beds and falls asleep in Wee Bear's bed. The end of the tale is reached when the bears return. Wee Bear finds his empty bowl, his broken chair, and the old woman sleeping in his bed and cries, "Somebody has been lying in my bed, and here she is!" The old woman wakes, is chased out of the house by the huge bear and is never seen again.

Origins

The story was first recorded in narrative form by English writer and poet Robert Southey, and first published anonymously as "The Story of the Three Bears" in 1837 in a volume of his writings called The Doctor. The same year Southey's tale was published, the story was versified by editor George Nicol, who acknowledged the anonymous author of The Doctor as "the great, original concocter" of the tale.  Southey was delighted with Nicol's effort to bring more exposure to the tale, concerned children might overlook it in The Doctor. Nicol's version was illustrated with engravings by B. Hart (after "C.J."), and was reissued in 1848 with Southey identified as the story's author.

The story of the three bears was in circulation before the publication of Southey's tale. In 1813, for example, Southey was telling the story to friends, and in 1831 Eleanor Mure fashioned a handmade booklet about the three bears and the old woman for her nephew Horace Broke's birthday. Southey and Mure differ in details. Southey's bears have porridge, but Mure's have milk; Southey's old woman has no motive for entering the house, but Mure's old woman is piqued when her courtesy visit is rebuffed; Southey's old woman runs away when discovered, but Mure's old woman is impaled on the steeple of St Paul's Cathedral.

Folklorists Iona and Peter Opie point out in The Classic Fairy Tales (1999) that the tale has a "partial analogue" in "Snow White": the lost princess enters the dwarfs' house, tastes their food, and falls asleep in one of their beds. In a manner similar to the three bears, the dwarfs cry, "Someone's been sitting in my chair!", "Someone's been eating off my plate!", and "Someone's been sleeping in my bed!" The Opies also point to similarities in a Norwegian tale about a princess who takes refuge in a cave inhabited by three Russian princes dressed in bearskins. She eats their food and hides under a bed.

In 1865, Charles Dickens referenced a similar tale in Our Mutual Friend, but in that story the house belongs to hobgoblins rather than bears. Dickens' reference however suggests a yet-to-be-discovered analogue or source. Hunting rituals and ceremonies have been suggested and dismissed as possible origins.

In 1894, "Scrapefoot", a tale with a fox as antagonist that bears striking similarities to Southey's story, was uncovered by the folklorist Joseph Jacobs and may predate Southey's version in the oral tradition.  Some sources state that it was illustrator John D. Batten who in 1894 reported a variant of the tale at least 40 years old. In this version, the three bears live in a castle in the woods and are visited by a fox called Scrapefoot who drinks their milk, sits in their chairs, and rests in their beds. This version belongs to the early Fox and Bear tale-cycle. Southey possibly heard "Scrapefoot", and confused its "vixen" with a synonym for an unpleasant malicious old woman. Some maintain however that the story as well as the old woman originated with Southey.

Southey most likely learned the tale as a child from his uncle William Tyler. Uncle Tyler may have told a version with a vixen (female fox) as the intruder, and then Southey may have later confused "vixen" with another common meaning of "a crafty old woman". P. M. Zall writes in "The Gothic Voice of Father Bear" (1974) that "it was no trick for Southey, a consummate technician, to recreate the improvisational tone of an Uncle William through rhythmical reiteration, artful alliteration ('they walked into the woods, while'), even bardic interpolation ('She could not have been a good, honest Old Woman')". Ultimately, it is uncertain where Southey or his uncle learned the tale.

Later variations: Goldilocks

Twelve years after the publication of Southey's tale, Joseph Cundall transformed the antagonist from an ugly old woman to a pretty little girl in his Treasury of Pleasure Books for Young Children. He explained his reasons for doing so in a dedicatory letter to his children, dated November 1849, which was inserted at the beginning of the book:

Once the little girl entered the tale, she remained – suggesting children prefer an attractive child in the story rather than an ugly old woman. The juvenile antagonist saw a succession of names: Silver Hair in the pantomime Harlequin and The Three Bears; or, Little Silver Hair and the Fairies by J. B. Buckstone (1853); Silver-Locks in Aunt Mavor's Nursery Tales (1858); Silverhair in George MacDonald's The Golden Key (1867); Golden Hair in Aunt Friendly's Nursery Book (ca. 1868); Silver-Hair and Goldenlocks at various times; Little Golden-Hair (1889); and finally Goldilocks in Old Nursery Stories and Rhymes (1904). Tatar credits English author Flora Annie Steel with naming the child in English Fairy Tales (1918).

Goldilocks's fate varies in the many retellings: in some versions, she runs into the forest, in some she is almost eaten by the bears but her mother rescues her, in some she vows to be a good child, and in some she returns home. Whatever her fate, Goldilocks fares better than Southey's vagrant old woman who, in his opinion, deserved a stint in the House of Correction, and far better than Miss Mure's old woman who is impaled upon a steeple in St Paul's church-yard.

Southey's all-male ursine trio has not been left untouched over the years. The group was re-cast as Papa, Mama, and Baby Bear, but the date of this change is disputed. Tatar indicates it occurred by 1852, while Katherine Briggs suggests the event occurred in 1878 with Mother Goose's Fairy Tales published by Routledge. With the publication of the tale by "Aunt Fanny" in 1852, the bears became a family in the illustrations to the tale but remained three bachelor bears in the text.

In Dickens' version of 1858, the two larger bears are brother and sister, and friends to the little bear. This arrangement represents the evolution of the ursine trio from the traditional three male bears to a family of father, mother, and child. In a publication c. 1860, the bears have become a family at last in both text and illustrations: "the old papa bear, the mama bear, and the little boy bear". In a Routledge publication c. 1867, Papa Bear is called Rough Bruin, Mama Bear is Mammy Muff, and Baby Bear is called Tiny. Inexplicably, the illustrations depict the three as male bears.

In publications subsequent to Aunt Fanny's of 1852, Victorian nicety required editors to routinely and silently alter Southey's "[T]here she sate till the bottom of the chair came out, and down came her's, plump upon the ground" to read "and down she came", omitting any reference to the human bottom. The cumulative effect of the several changes to the tale since its original publication was to transform a fearsome oral tale into a cosy family story with an unrealised hint of menace.

Interpretations
Maria Tatar, in The Annotated Classic Fairy Tales (2002), notes that Southey's tale is sometimes viewed as a cautionary tale that imparts a lesson about the hazards of wandering off and exploring unknown territory. Like "The Tale of the Three Little Pigs", the story uses repetitive formulas to engage the child's attention and to reinforce the point about safety and shelter. Tatar points out that the tale is typically framed today as a discovery of what is "just right", but for earlier generations, it was a tale about an intruder who could not control herself when encountering the possessions of others.

In The Uses of Enchantment (1976), the child psychologist Bruno Bettelheim describes Goldilocks as "poor, beautiful, and charming", and notes that the story does not describe her positively except for her hair. Bettelheim mainly discussed the tale in terms of Goldilocks' struggle to move past Oedipal issues to confront adolescent identity problems.

In Bettelheim's view, the tale fails to encourage children "to pursue the hard labour of solving, one at a time, the problems which growing up presents", and does not end as fairy tales should with the "promise of future happiness awaiting those who have mastered their Oedipal situation as a child". He believes the tale is an escapist one that thwarts the child reading it from gaining emotional maturity.

Tatar criticises Bettelheim's views: "[His] reading is perhaps too invested in instrumentalizing fairy tales, that is, in turning them into vehicles that convey messages and set forth behavioural models for the child. While the story may not solve Oedipal issues or sibling rivalry as Bettelheim believes "Cinderella" does, it suggests the importance of respecting property and the consequences of just 'trying out' things that do not belong to you."

Elms suggests Bettelheim may have missed the anal aspect of the tale that would make it helpful to the child's personality development. In Handbook of Psychobiography Elms describes Southey's tale not as one of Bettelheimian post-Oedipal ego development but as one of Freudian pre-Oedipal anality. He believes the story appeals chiefly to preschoolers who are engaged in "cleanliness training, maintaining environmental and behavioural order, and distress about disruption of order". His own experience and his observation of others lead him to believe children align themselves with the tidy, organised ursine protagonists rather than the unruly, delinquent human antagonist. In Elms's view, the anality of "The Story of the Three Bears" can be traced directly to Robert Southey's fastidious, dirt-obsessed aunt who raised him and passed her obsession to him in a milder form.

Literary elements
The story makes extensive use of the literary rule of three, featuring three chairs, three bowls of porridge, three beds, and the three title characters who live in the house. There are also three sequences of the bears discovering in turn that someone has been eating from their porridge, sitting in their chairs, and finally, lying in their beds, at which point is the climax of Goldilocks being discovered. This follows three earlier sequences of Goldilocks trying the bowls of porridge, chairs, and beds successively, each time finding the third "just right". Author Christopher Booker characterises this as the "dialectical three", where "the first is wrong in one way, the second in another or opposite way, and only the third, in the middle, is just right". Booker continues: "This idea that the way forward lies in finding an exact middle path between opposites is of extraordinary importance in storytelling". This concept has spread across many other disciplines, particularly developmental psychology, biology, economics, and engineering where it is called the "Goldilocks principle". In planetary astronomy, a planet orbiting its sun at just the right distance for liquid water to exist on its surface, neither too hot nor too cold, is referred to as being in the 'Goldilocks Zone'. As Stephen Hawking put it, "like Goldilocks, the development of intelligent life requires that planetary temperatures be 'just right.

Adaptations

See also 
 Little Red Riding Hood
 Goldilocks principle
Goldilocks: The Fame-Name-Dame

References

Citations

General sources 

 The Seven Basic Plots.

External links

 "The Story of the Three Bears", manuscript by Eleanor Mure, 1831 - first recorded version
 "The Story of the Three Bears" by Robert Southey, 1837 – first published version
 "The Story of the Three Bears", versified by George Nicol, 2nd edition, 1839 (text)
 "The Three Bears" by Robert Southey – later version with "Silver-hair", a "little girl"
 "Goldilocks and the Three Bears", by Katharine Pyle, 1918 – later version with father, mother and baby bear

 
1830s children's books
1837 short stories
19th-century British children's literature
Animal tales
Anthropomorphic bears
Bears in literature
British fairy tales
English fairy tales
English folklore
Female characters in fairy tales
Fictional trios
Literary characters introduced in 1837
Short stories adapted into films
Short stories adapted into plays
Works by Robert Southey